Karen Pearce Kryczka (born November 24, 1940) is a former politician from Alberta, Canada.

Kryczka was first elected to the Legislative Assembly of Alberta in the 1997 Alberta general election. She served as a back bench member for the Progressive Conservatives. In 2001 she was re-elected for a second term. She retired from her seat in 2004 when she decided not to run again.

In the Legislature she was the chair of the Seniors Advisory Council for Alberta.

She was a supporter of Jim Dinning's campaign in the 2006 Alberta Progressive Conservative leadership election.

Family
Kryczka is the mother of Canadian Olympian Kelly Kryczka, and was married to Adam Kryczka, the brother of Joe Kryczka.

References

External links
Karen Kryczka endorses Jim Dinning

1940 births
Living people
Politicians from Edmonton
Progressive Conservative Association of Alberta MLAs
Women MLAs in Alberta
21st-century Canadian politicians
21st-century Canadian women politicians